Lee Rogers  (born 10 March 1972) is a race car driver; he has raced the #69 pickup since 2005 in the UK Pickup Truck Racing series.

Notable Achievement
Lee was the Hot Rod Autospeed points champion in 2001 and 2002.

Career history
2005 - 2016 Pickup Truck Racing:
2013 - Pro 2 Drivers Champion
2013 - Team of the Year
2008 - Spirit of Pickup Truck Racing Award
2005 - Pickup Truck Racing Championship - 13th, 2nd in Rookie Championship

Pre Pickups

2004   Autospeed Stock Rods Overall Points Championship runner-up 2nd Overall, 2nd Taunton track championship, 2nd St. Day track championship, 2nd West of England championship, 2nd Grand National championship
2002   Hot Rod Autospeed points champion, 3rd Mendips Raceway points, Cornish champion
2001   Hot Rod Autospeed points champion, Mendips Raceway points champion, Western final runner up, Devon champion
1999   Hot Rod West of England runner up
1998   Hot Rod West of England champion
1997   Hot Rod Mendips Raceway Top red grade 5th overall
1996   Hot Rod 2nd Autospeed points championship

References

External links
 Official Website

English racing drivers
Living people
1972 births